Shila Ensandost is an Afghan teacher and activist for women's right to education.

Activism 
Shila is a graduate of religious studies and a teacher in several schools. She has participated in various demonstrations and women's associations.  In October 2021, together with her husband and daughter, she dressed in white in a demonstration simulating the post-death ritual to demand justice and freedom for women.

Recognition 

 BBC 100 Women

References 

Afghan people